Sayed Mohamed Mohamed Abdel Hafeez (born 27 October 1977) is an Egyptian retired professional footballer who played as a winger.

Career statistics

International

International Goals 
Scores and results list Egypt's goal tally first.

Honours

Club 
Al Ahly
 Egyptian Premier League: 1996–97, 1997–98, 1998–99, 1999–00, 2004–05, 2005–06
 Egypt Cup: 2001, 2003
 Egyptian Super Cup: 2002, 2005
 CAF Champions League: 2001, 2005
 CAF Super Cup: 2002

External links

1977 births
Living people
People from Faiyum
Egyptian footballers
Egyptian expatriate footballers
Egypt international footballers
Al Ahly SC players
Al-Wehda Club (Mecca) players
2000 African Cup of Nations players
Egyptian Premier League players
Saudi Professional League players
Expatriate footballers in Saudi Arabia
Egyptian expatriate sportspeople in Saudi Arabia
Association football midfielders